The Dortmund–Ems Canal is a  long canal in Germany between the inland port of the city of Dortmund and the seaport of Emden. The artificial southern part of the canal ends after  at Herbrum lock near Meppen. This latter section was built because inland ships at the time of the construction of the canal were not built for the open sea, which they would have faced at the Dollart and the entry to the sea port of Emden. It is connected to the Ems-Jade Canal from Emden to Wilhelmshaven.

History 
Also, the canal was supposed to make coal from the Ruhr area more competitive compared to imported English coal. Furthermore, the steel industry in the eastern Ruhr area needed to import ore from abroad.

The canal was attacked numerous times during World War II due to its strategic importance. Operation Garlic, an attack in September 1943 by  617 Squadron RAF (the "Dambusters") was unsuccessful and costly. The squadron attacked it again in September 1944 using Tallboy "earthquake" bombs breaching it and causing considerable damage. It was repaired after the conflict.

Description 
It operated until 1962, and was then replaced by a new elevator and a lock. Today it houses the Westfälisches Industriemuseum.

Some kilometres to the north, the canal reaches the city of Datteln, which lies at the crossroads of four canals:
 Datteln-Hamm Canal
 Wesel-Datteln Canal
 Dortmund–Ems Canal
 Rhein-Herne Canal

The old route of the canal crosses the rivers Lippe, Stever and Ems on bridges.

After the Second World War, the canal had to be widened. Those parts that were above ground level could not easily be widened, and therefore a new route was constructed between Olfen and Münster. It lies parallel to the old route, and new river crossings were also built. The old route was closed for shipping.

 is a 350 km long official long-distance cycling route next to the canal.

Towns along the canal
Dortmund - 
Waltrop - 
Datteln - 
Olfen -
Lüdinghausen - 
Senden - 
Hiltrup - 
Münster - 
Dörenthe - 
Hörstel - 
Bevergern - 
Rheine - 
Hesselte - 
Lingen - 
Geeste - 
Meppen - 
Haren - 
Papenburg -
Düthe - 
Heede - 
Lehe - 
Aschendorf - 
Oldersum - 
Emden -

References

Canals in Lower Saxony
Münster (region)
Dortmund
Federal waterways in Germany
Canals opened in 1899
1899 establishments in Germany